The River Duag is a river in County Tipperary, Ireland. It flows into the River Tar between Clogheen and Ballyporeen. The Tar in turn is a tributary of the River Suir.

See also
Rivers of Ireland

References 

Rivers of County Tipperary